Kas Ali Mirzayi (also Romanized as Kas ʿAlī Mīrzāyī; also known as Gholām ʿAli) is a village in Kuhdasht-e Shomali Rural District, in the Central District of Kuhdasht County, Lorestan Province, Iran. At the 2006 census, its population was 54, in 10 families.

References 

Towns and villages in Kuhdasht County